Istanbul is the largest city in Turkey, and is the country's economic and social center.

The tallest buildings in the city are Metropol Istanbul Tower 1 (70 floors / 280 metres, 301 metres including its twin spires) in the Ataşehir district on the Asian side of the city; and Skyland Istanbul Towers 1 and 2 (2 x 65 floors / 284 metres), located adjacent to Türk Telekom Stadium in the Seyrantepe quarter of the Sarıyer district, on the European side. The tallest building in Levent financial district is Istanbul Sapphire (54 floors / 238 metres, 261 metres including its spire). The tallest buildings in Istanbul are also among the tallest buildings in Europe.

The city saw a major boom in skyscrapers in the 21st century, situated mostly, but not only, in Levent, Maslak and Ataşehir.

An incomplete list of the tallest buildings in Istanbul:

Tallest Istanbul skyscrapers

Updated as of 27 November 2020
 This list includes only completed or topped-out structures.

Buildings under construction

Timeline of tallest buildings in Istanbul

See also
List of tallest buildings in Turkey

References

External links
Many photographs of Istanbul

Tallest, Istanbul
Istanbul-related lists
 List of tallest buildings in Istanbul